Bohrium is a synthetic chemical element with the symbol Bh and atomic number 107. It is named after Danish physicist Niels Bohr. As a synthetic element, it can be created in a laboratory but is not found in nature. All known isotopes of bohrium are highly radioactive; the most stable known isotope is 270Bh with a half-life of approximately 2.4 minutes, though the unconfirmed 278Bh may have a longer half-life of about 11.5 minutes.

In the periodic table, it is a d-block transactinide element. It is a member of the 7th period and belongs to the group 7 elements as the fifth member of the 6d series of transition metals. Chemistry experiments have confirmed that bohrium behaves as the heavier homologue to rhenium in group 7. The chemical properties of bohrium are characterized only partly, but they compare well with the chemistry of the other group 7 elements.

Introduction

History

Discovery
Two groups claimed discovery of the element. Evidence of bohrium was first reported in 1976 by a Soviet research team led by Yuri Oganessian, in which targets of bismuth-209 and lead-208 were bombarded with accelerated nuclei of chromium-54 and manganese-55 respectively. Two activities, one with a half-life of one to two milliseconds, and the other with an approximately five-second half-life, were seen. Since the ratio of the intensities of these two activities was constant throughout the experiment, it was proposed that the first was from the isotope bohrium-261 and that the second was from its daughter dubnium-257. Later, the dubnium isotope was corrected to dubnium-258, which indeed has a five-second half-life (dubnium-257 has a one-second half-life); however, the half-life observed for its parent is much shorter than the half-lives later observed in the definitive discovery of bohrium at Darmstadt in 1981. The IUPAC/IUPAP Transfermium Working Group (TWG) concluded that while dubnium-258 was probably seen in this experiment, the evidence for the production of its parent bohrium-262 was not convincing enough.

In 1981, a German research team led by Peter Armbruster and Gottfried Münzenberg at the GSI Helmholtz Centre for Heavy Ion Research (GSI Helmholtzzentrum für Schwerionenforschung) in Darmstadt bombarded a target of bismuth-209 with accelerated nuclei of chromium-54 to produce 5 atoms of the isotope bohrium-262:

 +  →  + 

This discovery was further substantiated by their detailed measurements of the alpha decay chain of the produced bohrium atoms to previously known isotopes of fermium and californium. The IUPAC/IUPAP Transfermium Working Group (TWG) recognised the GSI collaboration as official discoverers in their 1992 report.

Proposed names

In September 1992, the German group suggested the name nielsbohrium with symbol Ns to honor the Danish physicist Niels Bohr. The Soviet scientists at the Joint Institute for Nuclear Research in Dubna, Russia had suggested this name be given to element 105 (which was finally called dubnium) and the German team wished to recognise both Bohr and the fact that the Dubna team had been the first to propose the cold fusion reaction, and simultaneously help to solve the controversial problem of the naming of element 105. The Dubna team agreed with the German group's naming proposal for element 107.

There was an element naming controversy as to what the elements from 104 to 106 were to be called; the IUPAC adopted unnilseptium (symbol Uns) as a temporary, systematic element name for this element. In 1994 a committee of IUPAC recommended that element 107 be named bohrium, not nielsbohrium, since there was no precedent for using a scientist's complete name in the naming of an element. This was opposed by the discoverers as there was some concern that the name might be confused with boron and in particular the distinguishing of the names of their respective oxyanions, bohrate and borate. The matter was handed to the Danish branch of IUPAC which, despite this, voted in favour of the name bohrium, and thus the name bohrium for element 107 was recognized internationally in 1997; the names of the respective oxyanions of boron and bohrium remain unchanged despite their homophony.

Isotopes

Bohrium has no stable or naturally occurring isotopes. Several radioactive isotopes have been synthesized in the laboratory, either by fusing two atoms or by observing the decay of heavier elements. Twelve different isotopes of bohrium have been reported with atomic masses 260–262, 264–267, 270–272, 274, and 278, one of which, bohrium-262, has a known metastable state. All of these but the unconfirmed 278Bh decay only through alpha decay, although some unknown bohrium isotopes are predicted to undergo spontaneous fission.

The lighter isotopes usually have shorter half-lives; half-lives of under 100 ms for 260Bh, 261Bh, 262Bh, and 262mBh were observed. 264Bh, 265Bh, 266Bh, and 271Bh are more stable at around 1 s, and 267Bh and 272Bh have half-lives of about 10 s. The heaviest isotopes are the most stable, with 270Bh and 274Bh having measured half-lives of about 2.4 min and 40 s respectively, and the even heavier unconfirmed isotope 278Bh appearing to have an even longer half-life of about 11.5 minutes.

The most proton-rich isotopes with masses 260, 261, and 262 were directly produced by cold fusion, those with mass 262 and 264 were reported in the decay chains of meitnerium and roentgenium, while the neutron-rich isotopes with masses 265, 266, 267 were created in irradiations of actinide targets. The five most neutron-rich ones with masses 270, 271, 272, 274, and 278 (unconfirmed) appear in the decay chains of 282Nh, 287Mc, 288Mc, 294Ts, and 290Fl respectively. The half-lives of bohrium isotopes range from about ten milliseconds for 262mBh to about one minute for 270Bh and 274Bh, extending to about 11.5 minutes for the unconfirmed 278Bh, one of the longest-lived known superheavy nuclides.

Predicted properties
Very few properties of bohrium or its compounds have been measured; this is due to its extremely limited and expensive production and the fact that bohrium (and its parents) decays very quickly. A few singular chemistry-related properties have been measured, but properties of bohrium metal remain unknown and only predictions are available.

Chemical
Bohrium is the fifth member of the 6d series of transition metals and the heaviest member of group 7 in the periodic table, below manganese, technetium and rhenium. All the members of the group readily portray their group oxidation state of +7 and the state becomes more stable as the group is descended. Thus bohrium is expected to form a stable +7 state. Technetium also shows a stable +4 state whilst rhenium exhibits stable +4 and +3 states. Bohrium may therefore show these lower states as well. The higher +7 oxidation state is more likely to exist in oxyanions, such as perbohrate, analogous to the lighter permanganate, pertechnetate, and perrhenate. Nevertheless, bohrium(VII) is likely to be unstable in aqueous solution, and would probably be easily reduced to the more stable bohrium(IV).

Technetium and rhenium are known to form volatile heptoxides M2O7 (M = Tc, Re), so bohrium should also form the volatile oxide Bh2O7. The oxide should dissolve in water to form perbohric acid, HBhO4.
Rhenium and technetium form a range of oxyhalides from the halogenation of the oxide. The chlorination of the oxide forms the oxychlorides MO3Cl, so BhO3Cl should be formed in this reaction. Fluorination results in MO3F and MO2F3 for the heavier elements in addition to the rhenium compounds ReOF5 and ReF7. Therefore, oxyfluoride formation for bohrium may help to indicate eka-rhenium properties. Since the oxychlorides are asymmetrical, and they should have increasingly large dipole moments going down the group, they should become less volatile in the order TcO3Cl > ReO3Cl > BhO3Cl: this was experimentally confirmed in 2000 by measuring the enthalpies of adsorption of these three compounds. The values are for TcO3Cl and ReO3Cl are −51 kJ/mol and −61 kJ/mol respectively; the experimental value for BhO3Cl is −77.8 kJ/mol, very close to the theoretically expected value of −78.5 kJ/mol.

Physical and atomic
Bohrium is expected to be a solid under normal conditions and assume a hexagonal close-packed crystal structure (c/a = 1.62), similar to its lighter congener rhenium. Early predictions by Fricke estimated its density at 37.1 g/cm3, but newer calculations predict a somewhat lower value of 26–27 g/cm3.

The atomic radius of bohrium is expected to be around 128 pm. Due to the relativistic stabilization of the 7s orbital and destabilization of the 6d orbital, the Bh+ ion is predicted to have an electron configuration of [Rn] 5f14 6d4 7s2, giving up a 6d electron instead of a 7s electron, which is the opposite of the behavior of its lighter homologues manganese and technetium. Rhenium, on the other hand, follows its heavier congener bohrium in giving up a 5d electron before a 6s electron, as relativistic effects have become significant by the sixth period, where they cause among other things the yellow color of gold and the low melting point of mercury. The Bh2+ ion is expected to have an electron configuration of [Rn] 5f14 6d3 7s2; in contrast, the Re2+ ion is expected to have a [Xe] 4f14 5d5 configuration, this time analogous to manganese and technetium. The ionic radius of hexacoordinate heptavalent bohrium is expected to be 58 pm (heptavalent manganese, technetium, and rhenium having values of 46, 57, and 53 pm respectively). Pentavalent bohrium should have a larger ionic radius of 83 pm.

Experimental chemistry
In 1995, the first report on attempted isolation of the element was unsuccessful, prompting new theoretical studies to investigate how best to investigate bohrium (using its lighter homologs technetium and rhenium for comparison) and removing unwanted contaminating elements such as the trivalent actinides, the group 5 elements, and polonium.

In 2000, it was confirmed that although relativistic effects are important, bohrium behaves like a typical group 7 element. A team at the Paul Scherrer Institute (PSI) conducted a chemistry reaction using six atoms of 267Bh produced in the reaction between 249Bk and 22Ne ions. The resulting atoms were thermalised and reacted with a HCl/O2 mixture to form a volatile oxychloride. The reaction also produced isotopes of its lighter homologues, technetium (as 108Tc) and rhenium (as 169Re). The isothermal adsorption curves were measured and gave strong evidence for the formation of a volatile oxychloride with properties similar to that of rhenium oxychloride. This placed bohrium as a typical member of group 7. The adsorption enthalpies of the oxychlorides of technetium, rhenium, and bohrium were measured in this experiment, agreeing very well with the theoretical predictions and implying a sequence of decreasing oxychloride volatility down group 7 of TcO3Cl > ReO3Cl > BhO3Cl.

2 Bh + 3  + 2 HCl → 2  + 

The longer-lived heavy isotopes of bohrium, produced as the daughters of heavier elements, offer advantages for future radiochemical experiments. Although the heavy isotope 274Bh requires a rare and highly radioactive berkelium target for its production, the isotopes 272Bh, 271Bh, and 270Bh can be readily produced as daughters of more easily produced moscovium and nihonium isotopes.

Notes

References

Bibliography

External links

 Bohrium at The Periodic Table of Videos (University of Nottingham)

 
Chemical elements
Transition metals
Synthetic elements
Chemical elements with hexagonal close-packed structure